Rugby in Fiji may refer to:

 Rugby league in Fiji
 Rugby union in Fiji